West Township may refer to:

Illinois
 West Township, Effingham County, Illinois
 West Township, McLean County, Illinois

Indiana
 West Township, Marshall County, Indiana

Iowa
 West Township, Montgomery County, Iowa

Missouri
 West Township, New Madrid County, Missouri

Ohio
 West Township, Columbiana County, Ohio

Pennsylvania
 West Township, Huntingdon County, Pennsylvania

Township name disambiguation pages